Poem Field is the name of a series of 8 computer-generated animations by Stan Vanderbeek and Ken Knowlton in 1964-1967. The animations were programmed in a language called Beflix (short for "Bell Flicks"), which was developed by Knowlton.

It is notable as a feature of one of the earlier SIGGRAPH conferences.

References

External links 
Tate Intermedia Art:  La Mode, Science Friction, Breath Death, Poemfield # 2. Artist biography and streamable films (Flash video format).

Computer art